Hanumanth Rao Raghavapudi is an Indian film director and screenwriter known for his work in Telugu-language films. He made his directorial debut with Andala Rakshasi and went onto direct films such as Krishna Gadi Veera Prema Gaadha, LIE, Padi Padi Leche Manasu, and Sita Ramam .

Early life and career 
Raghavapudi hails from Kothagudem of Telangana. He studied up to graduation there and completed his MCA in Hyderabad.

He worked as an assistant director for movies Aithe, Okkadunnadu and as associate director for Anukokunda Oka Roju with director Chandra Sekhar Yeleti. He made his debut with Andala Rakshasi, and also directed the short film, I Am Famous along with feature films Krishna Gadi Veera Prema Gaadha, LIE and Padi Padi Leche Manasu. 

In 2022, Raghavpudi film Sita Ramam starring Dulquer Salman. It is a period drama set in 1964, produced by Vyjayanthi Movies.

Filmography

References

External links
 
 

Indian male screenwriters
Year of birth missing (living people)
Living people
Telugu film directors
Telugu screenwriters
Film directors from Telangana
Screenwriters from Telangana
People from Bhadradri Kothagudem district